Wilgena Station, commonly known as simply Wilgena, is a pastoral lease that operates as a sheep station in outback South Australia.

The Trans-Australian Railway line passes through the property near the small town of Tarcoola. Nonetheless, salt bush thrives on the Station, making good fodder for sheep.

The property is managed by Ian Matheson. The McBride family purchased the property in 1923 and at one stage Wilgena was regarded as the largest totally fenced sheep run in the world. The property was split up during the 1980s into two properties; Wilgena and the  North Well Station, which is run as a separate company enterprise.

The property is home to several rock holes that are able to trap water and were of great significance to the local Aboriginal peoples.

History 
Main and Sells owned the property in 1882 when they placed it up for auction along with Yardea Station.

In 1909 the lessee was Simon Matheson, who by 1911 was looking to sell the property. In 1913, a half-interest of the station was sold to Henry Teesdale Smith for £5,000. 1n 1918, the entire property was sold to Joseph Timms for £14.000.

In 1922, Timms offered the property to the government for soldier settlement. This did not eventuate, and instead the property was sold in 1923 to the McBrides, the present owners, who at that time owned other properties in the area such as Yardea. At that time the station was said to comprise . Wilgena had once been stocked with 70,000 sheep but had been used to graze cattle under Timms' management. The McBrides reverted to running sheep again.

The property had a plentiful supply of artesian water.

The land occupying the extent of the Wilgena Station pastoral lease was gazetted as a locality by the Government of South Australia on 26 April 2013 under the name 'Wilgena'.

See also
List of ranches and stations
List of the largest stations in Australia

References

Stations (Australian agriculture)
Pastoral leases in South Australia
Far North (South Australia)